The 2005 Time Warner Cable Road Runner 225 was the third round of the 2005 Bridgestone Presents the Champ Car World Series Powered by Ford season, held on June 4, 2005 at the Milwaukee Mile in West Allis, Wisconsin.  Jimmy Vasser was the pole sitter while Paul Tracy won the race.  Vasser's pole position was the ninth and final of his career.

Qualifying results

Race

Caution flags

Notes

 Average Speed 130.301 mph
 Race shortened by Champ Car rule limiting races to one hour, forty-five minutes.

Championship standings after the race

Drivers' Championship standings

 Note: Only the top five positions are included.

External links
 Full Weekend Times & Results
 Qualifying Results
 Race Box Score

Milwaukee
Milwaukee Indy 225
Time Warner Cable